Robert Meston was an Australian politician.

He was a pastoralist in the Clarence River district before entering politics. In 1860 he was elected to the New South Wales Legislative Assembly for Tenterfield, but he resigned in 1861.

References

Year of birth missing
Year of death missing
Members of the New South Wales Legislative Assembly